Mark Cousins (8 October 1947 – 26 September 2020) was a British cultural critic and architectural theorist. He studied Art History at Merton College, Oxford and was a research student at the Warburg Institute. From 1993 he was the Director of General Studies and Head of the Graduate Program in Histories and Theories at the Architectural Association. He was also Visiting Professor of Architecture at Columbia University and Southeast University, Nanjing.

He co-founded the London Consortium along with Paul Hirst, Colin MacCabe, and Richard Humphreys.

He was the author of Michel Foucault, co-written with Athar Hussain (London: Macmillan, 1984); The Ugly, a series of articles published at AA Files (1995, 1996); the Introduction to the Penguin Edition of The Unconscious by Sigmund Freud (London: Penguin:2005).  
Cousins gave the Friday Lectures at the Architectural Association for over thirty years.

Selected articles
 'Technology and Prosthesis', Hurly-Burly Issue 5, March 2011, pp. 191–199. ISSN 2101-0307
 Introduction, The Unconscious, Sigmund Freud. London: Penguin Modern Classics, 2005. .
 'The Insistence of the Image: Hitchcock's Vertigo', in Adams, Parveen (ed.) Art: Sublimation or Symptom. London: Karnac Books. 2003, pp.3-26.  
 'The Ugly', AA Files, 28, Autumn 1994, pp 61–64. 
 'The Ugly', AA Files, 29, Summer 1995, pp 3–6. 
 'The Ugly', AA Files, 30, Autumn 1995, pp. 65–68. 
 'Lo feo', Analysart, 17. Caracas: Instituto de Estudios Avanzados, 1999. (Spanish Translation of The Ugly).
 'La Arquitectura y sus Pasados', RevistArquis 2, Universidad de Costa Rica, 2012. (Spanish Translation) ISSN 2215-275X 
 'In the Midst of Psychoanalysis', New Formations 7, Spring 1989, pp. 77-87.
 'The Logic of Deconstruction.' Oxford Literary Review, vol. 3, no. 2, 1978, pp. 70–7. ISSN 0305-1498

References

Architectural Association PhD Programme

External link
Article by Cousins on Paul Hirst and The London Consortium

British architects
Alumni of Merton College, Oxford
Alumni of the Warburg Institute
Columbia University faculty
Academic staff of Southeast University
1947 births
2020 deaths